Lanús is a partido in Buenos Aires Province, Argentina, at the south of the Gran Buenos Aires urban conglomerate neighbouring Buenos Aires city.

Its capital is the city of Lanús.

Lanús Partido is connected to the Buenos Aires city across the Valentín Alsina Bridge over the Riachuelo River. The name of the partido comes from the former land owner Anacarsis Lanús, who was a pioneer in the urbanization of the area.

Sports
The partido is home to Club Atlético Lanús, a football club playing in the Argentine Primera Division.

Districts
Gerli
Lanús (sometimes subdivided into Lanús Este and Lanús Oeste)
Monte Chingolo
Remedios de Escalada
Valentín Alsina

References

External links

 

 
Partidos of Buenos Aires Province
1945 establishments in Argentina